Baker Tilly US, LLP (doing business as Baker Tilly) is a public accounting and consulting firm headquartered in Chicago, Illinois. Formerly known as Virchow, Krause & Company, LLP, the firm is the American member of Baker Tilly International, a global accounting network headquartered in London, United Kingdom. Having joined Baker Tilly International in 1999, the firm officially adopted the Baker Tilly name on June 1, 2009. Vault Accounting 50 has ranked Baker Tilly Virchow Krause, LLP as the 9th most prestigious accounting firm in their 2019 ranking.

History
The firm originated in 1931 and the present partnership was organized in 1953.

On June 1, 2009, the former Virchow, Krause & Company, LLP changed its name to Baker Tilly Virchow Krause, LLP, becoming the only U.S. member of the Baker Tilly International network to be branded as "Baker Tilly".

Baker Tilly Virchow Krause, LLP merged with Philadelphia-based ParenteBeard, LLC effective October 1, 2014.

On September 20, 2021 Baker Tilly, US, LLP acquired Charleston, WV based accounting and consulting firm Arnett Carbis Toothman. Baker Tilly US, LLP merged with the California based accounting firm Squar Milner and acquired the New York based firm Margolin, Winer & Evens effective November 1, 2020. It was also announced on November 3, 2021 that Baker Tilly, US, LLP is acquiring The MFA Companies, a Boston based financial services and consulting firm.

Locations
Baker Tilly currently has 61 offices throughout 19 states in the Northeast, Midwest, South and West.

The Baker Tilly headquarters is located in Chicago and the firm has another office in Illinois as well.

There are also offices located in Massachusetts, West Virginia, Ohio, California, Colorado, Arizona,Delaware, Georgia, Florida, Indiana, Kansas, Maryland, Michigan, Minnesota, North Carolina, New Jersey, New York, Oklahoma, Pennsylvania, Texas, Washington (state), Washington DC, and Wisconsin.

Ranking
Baker Tilly is the 9th largest CPA and consulting firm in the United States.

Baker Tilly has been recognized as a "Best Places to Work" for women. Baker Tilly was awarded "Best Places to Work" in both Chicago and Minneapolis.

Baker Tilly International is the 9th largest accounting firm worldwide.

References

External links

Baker Tilly
Accounting firms of the United States